Narges Kalhor (born  in Tehran) is an Iranian film director. She is the daughter of Mehdi Kalhor, the former media and cultural advisor to former President of Iran Mahmoud Ahmadinejad. She studied Film at the Beh-andish College in Teheran and has produced films critical of the Iranian government.

In October 2009, while visiting Germany to present her short film "Die Egge" at the Nuremberg Film Festival, Kalhor applied for political asylum in Germany, claiming to have received warnings that she could be in danger if she returns to Iran because of her critical stance on her country.

Kalhor actively participated in the 2009 Iranian election protests.

Together with Benedikt Schwarzer, she co-directed the short documentary SHOOT ME, which is nominated for the German Short Film Award 2014.

Filmografie 
 2001: Without Discussion 
 2002: Illusions of a Persian Cat  
 2007: Enlightenment of a Hen  
 2007: We Must Have Died  
 2008: Die Egge 
 2008: Hair  
 2009: After Green  
 2009: Bijan And Manigeh In Tehran
 2011: Munich - Tehran
 2013: SHOOT ME
 2014: Kafan
 2014: Lavashak

References

External links 
 

Living people
Iranian film directors
1984 births
Iranian people of Kurdish descent